Olmo may refer to:

Olmo, Haute-Corse, a commune on Corsica, France
Olmo (surname)
Olmo grapes, a grape variety